Ed Drew (August 22, 1865 – May 15, 1911) was an Arizona rancher, miner, and lawman in the final years of the Old West. He is most remembered for his family of pioneers and his death during a shootout near Ray.

Early life 

Edward Landers "Ed" Drew was born at Lander, Wyoming on August 22, 1865, while his parents, William Henry Harrison Drew and Georgiann Stuart Drew, were crossing the Great Plains to Montana. His twin brother, Edwin Drew, died at birth, but he had other siblings to grow up with.

Move to Arizona 

By 1876, the Drew family had made their way down to Arizona Territory and settled along the San Pedro River near Contention City. There William Drew built a ranch and a stagecoach station, which later became known as Drew's Station.

In his youth, both Drew and his younger sister, Cora, became skilled equestrians. They won several contests in Arizona and New Mexico Territory between the 1890s and the early 1900s. In 1888, at the age of sixteen, Cora was asked to perform in Buffalo Bill's Wild West by Buffalo Bill Cody himself. Her mother refused to allow it though, probably due to her age, but Cora did get to attend the 1893 World's Fair in Chicago, Illinois.

Death of Bud Philpot 

On March 15, 1881, Drew heard the sound of gunfire that killed Bud Philpot. Philpot, a stagecoach driver, was ambushed and robbed in one of the many incidents leading to the historic Gunfight at the O.K. Corral in Tombstone. After mounting his horse, Drew rode towards the sound of the gunfire and found Philpot's body lying in a wash. He then rode to the house of a neighboring rancher, T. W. Ayles, who, coincidentally, was in the process of writing a letter to the Tombstone Epitaph concerning lawlessness in the territory. Ayles wrote: "Right here I am stopped by the entrance of a messenger who reports that down coach from Tombstone to-night, and which passed here a[t] 8:00 p.m., had been shot into and 'Bud', the driver is now lying on the roadside, dead, with his whip alongside of him. And just now Eddie Drew, a young son of the station keeper at Drew's Station, informs me that he saw the dead man and recognized him as 'Bud,' the driver of the coach."

Bass Canyon ranch 

In 1884, after two years of working as a wagon teamster at the Johnson mine, Drew, two Mexican men, and a man named Melvin Jones went into the Sulphur Springs Valley to build a cattle ranch at Bass Canyon, bringing a herd along with them. However, when they were riding through the land of Glendy King, the old recluse refused to let them pass. Drew told King that he intended to go on with or without permission so the latter opened fire on Drew with a rifle, shooting the reins out of his hands. Melvin Jones then responded by pulling out his Winchester and shooting King, who died as result. Rumors that renegade Apaches killed King immediately began circulating.

Drew turned himself a little while later to the local sheriff and the true story was revealed. After being exonerated of shooting King, Drew and Melvin built their ranch. Drew went to Mexico to buy horses, leaving Melvin to manage things. When he returned with 1,000 head of horses three months later, Drew found that Melvin had not accomplished what they had agreed to so Drew ended the partnership. The ranch then became known as the Drew Ranch.

Work for Henry Hooker 

Between 1894 and 1910, Drew worked as a cowboy and foreman of the Sierra Bonita Ranch, which was owned by Colonel Henry Hooker. He married Marie Preston of West Virginia on March 20, 1898, and they went on to have three children. That same year, the Drew Ranch was sold to Sam and Johnny Boyett, the latter of whom would later gain notoriety for killing Warren Earp during a dispute at a saloon in Willcox.

Move to Pima, Arizona 

According to newspapers from 1900, Drew bought a farm at Pima from a man named John Nash and settled there with his family, however, he continued working at the Sierra Bonita Ranch. The newspapers also say that Drew fractured one of his legs that year, after he accidentally rode off the edge of a cliff with his horse.

By 1909, Drew had a mining claim in the Turquoise District. The local newspaper reported on February 12, 1909 that Drew sold his one-third interest in the Triangle No. 1 Mining Claim and that a Mrs. L. J. Lemion, who owned the other two-thirds, sold her share as well. Drew was to be paid $3,333,33 in installments over the next few years, but he was killed in Sonoratown on May 15, 1911.

Death at Sonoratown 

On February 11, 1911, Drew accepted an appointment from the Pinal County sheriff, James E. McGree, to become his deputy. He was, however, killed just a short time after being sworn in. On the night of May 15, 1911, shortly before 12:00 A.M., Drew was in a saloon at Sonoratown, a small mining town located just south of Ray, Arizona, when a bandit named Jack Monroe entered through the back door with a mask over his face and a revolver in his hand.

According to a May 17, 1911, edition of the Arizona Republican, Drew was immediately confronted by Monroe, who said: "Throw up your hands." There was a moment of hesitation though, because Drew was not going to give up without a fight. Monroe then stepped closer and slapped Drew in the face, saying: "Throw up your hands damned quick." But instead, Drew pulled out his revolver and was subsequently struck by a bullet from Monroe. According to the Arizona Republican, the shot did not incapacitate Drew, who then began firing and advancing on Monroe. Monroe retreated to behind the bar and the fighting continued for a few seconds until Drew fell over dead. He had been shot twice and it was later determined that Monroe was also badly wounded in the chest, but managed to escape town.

The May 17, 1911, edition of the Arizona Republican says the following:

The murderer, Jack Monroe, was captured a few days later at his camp outside of Ray and dealt with accordingly. Drew's body was taken to Pearce by his brother, Charles, and he was buried in the Pearce Cemetery next to his mother, Georgiann, who died in 1906. Presently, Drew's tombstone mistakenly says that he died on May 11, 1911, instead of May 15.

The following was written in a Courtland, Arizona newspaper on May 20, 1911:

The following appeared in the Tombstone Prospector on May 18, 1911:

The Drew Ranch is now owned by the Nature Conservancy. Also, members of Drew's family still live in Arizona today.

See also 

 List of Old West lawmen
 Cochise County in the Old West
 Jimmie Mercer

References 

1865 births
1911 deaths
People from Lander, Wyoming
People from Cochise County, Arizona
Lawmen of the American Old West
History of Arizona
Crime in Arizona Territory
American deputy sheriffs
Arizona pioneers
American twins
Cowboys